The 2018 UCLA Bruins football team represented the University of California, Los Angeles in the 2018 NCAA Division I FBS football season. The Bruins were led by first-year head coach Chip Kelly and played their home games at the Rose Bowl. UCLA was a member of the Pac-12 Conference in the South Division. They began the season 0–4 for the first time since 1971, and 0–5 for the first time since 1943, before finally winning their first game, in dominating fashion, against Cal. However, despite failing to improve upon their previous season's output of six wins and seven losses and failing to qualify for a bowl game, the Bruins later defeated the USC Trojans to end a three-game losing streak in their crosstown rivalry. The Bruins finished 3–9 overall, their worst record since 1971. They went 3–6 in Pac-12 play, finishing fifth in the South Division, and were outscored by their opponents by a combined score of 409 to 295.

Previous season

The Bruins began the season at 2–0, where the first win was a historic 35-point comeback against Texas A&M in front of 64,635 spectators at home on FOX. At the conclusion of the second win, which was a 56–23 rout against Hawaii in front of 50,444 individuals at home on the Pac-12 Network, the Bruins were ranked No. 25 in the AP Poll. However, the Bruins would immediately be unranked after their loss at Memphis, and would have five more losses and four more wins at the conclusion of the regular season. As a result, Jim Mora was fired, a day after losing to rival USC for the third straight year, for "not [meeting] expectations" with the talent recruited. Nevertheless, the Bruins participated in the 2017 Cactus Bowl against Kansas State, but they lost 17–35. The Bruins finished with an overall record 6–7, and 4–5 in conference play.

NFL Draft Selections

The Bruins had five individuals selected in the 2018 NFL Draft.

Preseason

Award watch lists
Listed in the order that they were released

Pac-12 Media Days
The 2018 Pac-12 media day was July 25, 2018 in Hollywood, California. The Pac-12 media poll was released with the Bruins predicted to finish in fourth place at Pac-12 South division.

Recruiting

Position key

Recruits
The Bruins signed a total of 27 recruits.

Schedule

Sources:

Personnel

Coaching staff

Roster

Game summaries

Cincinnati

Although favored by two touchdowns over the Bearcats, the Chip Kelly era at UCLA got off to a disappointing start with the loss vs. Cincinnati. Despite jumping out to an early 10–0 lead after one quarter of play, UCLA was slowed by the Bearcats for most of the remainder of the game. There was some brilliance rushing the ball by freshman running back Kazmeir Allen, who scored a 74-yard touchdown in the 3rd, but the pass game never seemed to click (with only 162 yards in the air and no touchdowns passing), several receivers dropped critical passes, and the offense struggled for the majority of the game. Additionally, starting quarterback Wilton Speight suffered a back injury in the 2nd quarter and had to be replaced with true freshman Dorian Thompson-Robinson.

A fumble by Thompson-Robinson deep in UCLA's own territory in the 4th quarter led to a costly safety, which ultimately swung the game in favor of Cincy. Meanwhile, Cincinnati's offense, led by a freshman Desmond Ridder at quarterback after starting signal-caller Hayden Moore went off with an early injury, had fewer total yards (304 against UCLA's 306) than the Bruins but dominated time of possession. The "nail in the coffin" for UCLA was perhaps a penalty for 12 men on the field against the Bruin defense, which came on 4th down during a critical goal line stand; this allowed Cincinnati to eventually score a touchdown rather than kick a field goal.

In all, the UCLA team was too inconsistent on the day and made too many crucial blunders to get the win against a talented Bearcats team that, though initially projected at the beginning of the year to be rather weak, would actually go on to win 10 games. After the game, Coach Kelly said in an interview that he intended to remain positive despite the loss.

at Oklahoma

Fresno State

at Colorado

Yet another disappointing Bruins loss led to UCLA equaling their worst start (0-4) since 1971, despite signs of improvement in the 1st half. Another lackluster performance by starting quarterback Dorian Thompson-Robinson led to many calling for the true freshman to be benched by Coach Kelly.

Washington

UCLA came close to upsetting the #10-ranked Huskies, but ultimately fell short as they started a season winless through 5 games for the first time since 1943.

at California

Giving reason for optimism to both players and fans alike, the Bruins finally earned their first victory of the season by manhandling Cal on the road, 37–7. Digging in, UCLA's defense was stout, forcing 5 turnovers (on 2 interceptions of Cal quarterback Brandon McIlwain and 3 fumble recoveries, including one that was run back for a touchdown by Keisean Lucier-South) while not surrendering any turnovers on offense themselves. Bruin running back Joshua Kelley also had a tremendous game, continuing his hot streak by scoring 3 touchdowns while rushing for an impressive 157 yards on 30 carries.

A Bruin victory at California Memorial Stadium also marked UCLA's first true road win in over two years, dating back to their 17–14 triumph over Brigham Young in 2016.

Arizona

Utah

at Oregon

at Arizona State

USC

Joshua Kelley ran for 289 yards and 2 TDs, leading the Bruins to a 34-27 victory. His 289 yards comprised the 3rd-highest single-game tally in UCLA history, and the most rushing yards by a Bruin in a game against their crosstown rival USC. After a back-and-forth game, Kelley scored a 55-yard touchdown with 10:39 remaining in the 4th quarter to give UCLA the lead, which they were able to maintain. With the win, UCLA were able to finally reclaim the rights to the coveted Victory Bell for the first time in four years.

Stanford

The Bruins had possession of the ball twice in the final  minutes of the game, but failed to go ahead or even the score on both drives in a 49–42 defeat to Stanford. Cardinal quarterback K. J. Costello threw a career-high five touchdowns, including three to receiver J. J. Arcega-Whiteside. UCLA had scored 15 unanswered points to briefly take the lead in the fourth quarter but ultimately suffered their 11th straight loss to the Cardinal.

Speight threw for a career-high 466 yards in his final collegiate game, and despite the loss, the Bruins accumulated a season-high 528 yards of total offense. Tight end Caleb Wilson added 184 yards receiving. The Rose Bowl attendance of 38,391 was the Bruins' smallest home crowd since 1997. UCLA finished the season with a 3–9 record, their worst since going 2–7–1 in 1971.

Honors

Pac-12

Players drafted into the NFL

Notes
 August 30, 2018 – Wilton Speight named starting quarterback for the Bruins for the season opener vs. Cincinnati.
 September 21, 2018 – Sophomore QB Devon Modster announces his intentions to transfer from UCLA.
 October 15, 2018 –  Keisean Lucier-South named Pac-12 Conference Defensive Player of the Week.
 November 19, 2018 – Joshua Kelley named Pac-12 Conference Offensive Player of the Week.

References

UCLA
UCLA Bruins football seasons
UCLA Bruins football